Vanakkam Thalaiva is a 2005 Tamil language drama film directed by Sakthi Paramesh. It stars Sathyaraj, Abbas, Susan, and Vivek.

Plot
The plot is dramatically woven around the different roles donned by Satyaraj and the reason behind him taking up such roles. The movies begins with Manickam (Sathyaraj) kidnapping Divya (Susan), who is the girl friend of Mano (Abbas). Mano decides to rescue Divya, but fails to do so after repeated attempts. In every attempt he is foiled by Manickam through one of his many disguises.

At this point Mano's friend Aruchamy (Vivek) comes to help him in his dilemma. Aruchamy is a suspended police office and managed to be appointed by Manickam to be his lorry cleaner. This way he and Mano trace out where Divya is held. Mano, realizing that it is Manickam who has been foiling his attempts to rescue Divya, goes to the place where she is kept hidden along with the police. This is where the plot twister starts.

Divya suddenly says that was married to Manickam years ago and that she never knew Mano. This statement makes Mano go crazy.

Finally, Aruchamy make Manickam confess the truth. Manickam's wife Ramya (Pranathi) was run over by Mano's car, when Mano had driven the vehicle completely under the influence of alcohol. The case was covered up using his wealth and status. Just to teach him a lesson, Manickam along with his sister-in-law Divya enacted such a drama.

Cast
Sathyaraj as Manickam 
Abbas as Mano
Susan as Divya
Pranathi as Ramya 
Vivek as Aruchamy 
Vennira Aadai Moorthy
Nalini
Shakeela
Thalapathy Dinesh
Abhinayashree (special appearance in "Suttapazham")

Soundtrack
Soundtrack was composed by Deva, while lyrics were written by Pa. Vijay, Snehan, Yugabharathi and Punitha Prakash.

Critical reception
Indiaglitz wrote "Debutant director Sakthi Paramesh has taken a good theme, but has given it a bad treatment". Sify wrote "It is a far out plot with a wafer-thin storyline and you will have to suspend disbelief. The film is strictly for the B and C audience whose idea of entertainment is double entendre and crude gags". Balaji B wrote " It is a trademark Satyaraj film loaded with film spoofs, satirical dialogs, glamor and item numbers. The problem is that none of these fit into the underlying story that slots the film in the thriller genre". Malathi Ranagarajan of The Hindu noted that "Had it not been caught in unwarranted commercial features, `Vanakkam ... ' would have been a very positive film with a poignant message".

References

External links
 Vanakkam Thalaiva  

2005 films
Films scored by Deva (composer)
2000s Tamil-language films